Orion 3 was an American spacecraft which was intended for use by Orion Network Systems, as a geostationary communications satellite. It was to have been positioned in geostationary orbit at a longitude of 139° East, from where it was to have provided communications services to Asia and Oceania. Due to a malfunction during launch, it was instead delivered to a useless low Earth orbit.

Orion 3 was constructed by Hughes Space and Communications, based on an HS-601HP satellite bus. The satellite was expected to remain operational for around fifteen years. Orion Network Systems merged with Loral Space & Communications in 1999 after the Orion 3 launch failure.

Launch

The Orion 3 satellite was launched on the second flight of the Delta III rocket, using the standard 8930 configuration. The launch occurred from Space Launch Complex 17B at the Cape Canaveral Air Force Station, at 01:00:00 GMT on 5 May 1999. The first stage and solid rocket motors performed as expected, and the first burn of the second stage was conducted as planned, injecting the spacecraft into low Earth orbit. Following this, the rocket entered a coast phase, before the second stage restarted for what was planned to be a 162-second burn to insert Orion 3 into a geosynchronous transfer orbit. It was the second failure of an RL-10 powered rocket in less than a week, after the Centaur upper stage of a Titan IV rocket failed during the launch of USA-143 on 30 April, although this incident was later attributed to a programming error.

An investigation later determined that the failure of Orion 3's launch was due to the wall of the RL-10 combustion chamber being breached. The investigation found that it was likely that the breach in the chamber was along one of the seams where the chamber had been soldered. On this engine, one of those seams had failed during a static firing, and despite subsequent repair, it was suspected that the same seam had failed again.

The orbit of the Orion 3 satellite was raised slightly, and its inclination reduced, using onboard propulsion. Its operators received US$247 million in insurance for the loss of the satellite, which was turned over to its insurers. The insurers considered asking NASA to fly a Space Shuttle mission to attach a solid rocket motor to the satellite, which would have been used to correct its orbit. The Shuttle mission would have been similar to STS-49, which reboosted Intelsat 603 following the failure of its launch on a Commercial Titan III. Unlike with Intelsat 603, however, Orion 3 would have needed to perform a Lunar flyby to reduce inclination. NASA considered attaching cameras and a scientific payload to the satellite for the flyby, however reboosting the satellite was subsequently deemed to not be sufficiently cost-effective, and Orion 3 was abandoned.

See also

1999 in spaceflight

References

Satellites using the BSS-601 bus
Spacecraft launched in 1999
Satellite launch failures
Space accidents and incidents in the United States